San Jose Spiders may refer to:

 San Jose Spiders (NWBL), women's professional basketball team, 2005-2006
 San Jose Spiders (AUDL), former (2014-2021) name of Oakland Spiders, men's professional ultimate disc team